SELENE (Selenological and Engineering Explorer), better known in Japan by its nickname , was the second Japanese lunar orbiter spacecraft following the Hiten probe. Produced by the Institute of Space and Astronautical Science (ISAS) and the National Space Development Agency (NASDA), the spacecraft was launched on September 14, 2007.  After successfully orbiting the Moon for a year and eight months, the main orbiter was instructed to impact on the lunar surface near the crater Gill on June 10, 2009.

Nickname
The orbiter's nickname, Kaguya, was selected by the general public. It comes from the name of a lunar princess in the ancient Japanese folktale The Tale of the Bamboo Cutter. After their successful release, its sub-satellites, Rstar and Vstar, were named Okina and Ouna, also derived from characters in the tale.

Mission objectives
The main scientific objectives of the mission were to:
 Study the origins of the Moon and its geologic evolution
 Obtain information about the lunar surface environment
 Perform radio science, especially precise measurement of the Moon's gravity field

Launch

The SELENE mission was originally scheduled to launch in 2003, but rocket failures on another mission and technical difficulties delayed the launch until 2007. Launch was planned for August 16, 2007, but was postponed when some electronic components were found to be installed incorrectly.

Lunar operations
On October 3, it entered an initial  polar lunar orbit.
On October 9, the relay satellite was released into a  orbit, while on October 12 the VLBI satellite was released into a  one. Finally, by October 19, the orbiter was in a circular  orbit. The nominal mission duration was one year plus possible extensions.

On October 31, 2007, Kaguya deployed its Lunar Magnetometer, Lunar Radar Sounder, Earth-looking Upper Atmosphere and Plasma Imager. On December 21, 2007, Kaguya began regular operations after all fifteen observation experiments had been satisfactorily verified.

Kaguya completed the planned operation by the end of October 2008 and began extended operations planned to continue through March 2009. It would then be sent into a circular  orbit, and finally to an elliptical  one, with a controlled impact occurring by August 2009. Because of a degraded reaction wheel, the plan was changed so that on February 1, 2009, the orbit was lowered to  ± ,
and impact occurred at 18:25 UTC on June 10, 2009.

Design
The mission featured three separate spacecraft:

Main orbiter

Shape: octagonal prism
Mass: 
Size: 2.1 x 2.1 x 4.8 m (6.9 x 6.9 x 16 ft)
Attitude control: Three-axis stabilized
Power: 3.5 kW (Max.)
Mission period: 1 year
Mission orbit: Circular, 
Inclination: 90 degrees

Okina (small relay satellite)
Okina (formerly Rstar) and Ouna (formerly Vstar) were octagonal prisms to support radio science. Okina relayed radio communications between the orbiter and the Earth when the orbiter was behind the Moon. This allowed, for the first time, the direct Doppler shift measurements needed
to precisely map the gravitational field of the lunar farside; previously, the farside gravity field could only be inferred by nearside measurements. The relay satellite impacted the lunar farside near the Mineur D crater at 19:46 JST (10:46 UTC) on February 12, 2009.

Function: two-way radio science relay, orbiter-earth
Mass: 
Size: 1.0 x 1.0 x 0.65 m (3.3 x 3.3 x 2.1 ft)
Attitude control: spin-stabilized
Power: 70 W
Initial orbit: 
Inclination: 90 degrees

Ouna (VLBI satellite)
Ouna used Very Long Baseline Interferometry as a second way to map the Moon's gravity field. It was especially useful at the lunar limb, where the gravitational acceleration is perpendicular to the line of sight to earth, making Doppler measurements unsuitable.

Function: VLBI radio science
Mass: 
Size: 1.0 x 1.0 x 0.65 m (3.3 x 3.3 x 2.1 ft)
Attitude control: spin-stabilized
Power: 70 W
Initial orbit: 
Inclination: 90 degrees

Payload

SELENE carried 13 scientific instruments "to obtain scientific data of the lunar origin and evolution and to develop the technology for the future lunar exploration":

Terrain camera (TC) (resolution 10 meters [33 ft] per pixel)
X-ray fluorescence spectrometer (XRS)
Lunar magnetometer (LMAG)
Spectral profiler (SP) (resolution per pixel: 562 x 400 m [1840 x 1310 ft)
Multi-band imager (MI) (resolution of visible light 20 [66 ft] meters per pixel, near-infrared 62 meters [200 ft] per pixel)
Laser altimeter (LALT)
Lunar radar sounder (LRS)
Gamma ray spectrometer (GRS)
Charged particle spectrometer (CPS)
Plasma analyzer (PACE)
Upper atmosphere and plasma imager (UPI)
Radio wave repeater (RSAT) aboard Okina
Radio wave source for VLBI (VRAD) aboard Okina and Ouna

Two 2.2 megapixel CCD HDTV cameras, one wide-angle and one telephoto, were also on board, primarily for public outreach. The HDTV system, developed by NHK (Japan Broadcasting Corporation), produced over 1.3 TB of video and stills over 19 months.

JAXA collected names and messages that were carried on SELENE through their "Wish Upon the Moon" campaign. 412,627 names and messages were printed on a sheet measuring 280 mm x 160 mm (11 x 6.3 in) at 70 µm (0.0003 in) per character. The sheet was installed under the photovoltaic modules and cooling panels beneath the multi-layered insulation.

Results
Major results include:
Improved lunar global topography maps. This detailed altitude and geological data was provided to Google for free to make Google Moon 3-D.
Detailed gravity map of the far side of the Moon.
First optical observation of the permanently shadowed interior of the crater Shackleton at the lunar south pole.
Evidence of earth's oxygen being transported to the moon via magnetospheric ions.

Other lunar probes
SELENE was part of a renewed global interest in lunar exploration; it was "the largest lunar mission since the Apollo program". It followed Japan's first lunar probe, Hagoromo, launched in 1990. China launched its Chang'e 1 lunar explorer on October 24, 2007, followed by India's October 22, 2008 launch of Chandrayaan-1 and the United States Lunar Reconnaissance Orbiter in June 2009. The United States, European countries (ESA), Russia, Japan, India and China are planning future crewed lunar exploration missions or lunar outpost construction on the Moon between 2018 and 2025.

See also

SELENE-2
List of missions to the Moon
Exploration of the Moon

References

External links

 Official project site, JAXA
 Official launch information site, JAXA
SELENE Mission Profile by NASA's Solar System Exploration
 SELENE overview, ISAS/JAXA
 Official YouTube channel, JAXA
 June 10th impact location 
 NEC Corporation's Kaguya page, NEC Corporation
JAXA Link - Video 12 min. before impact - close surface flyover

Missions to the Moon
Japanese space probes
Japanese Lunar Exploration Program
LQ30 quadrangle
Space probes launched in 2007
Spacecraft that orbited the Moon
Spacecraft that impacted the Moon
Spacecraft launched by H-II rockets
2009 on the Moon